Ani Kyd (born September 15, 1969) is a Canadian, Vancouver-based musician, actor, and life coach.

Career 
Kyd has worked with musicians including Meegan Bradfield (Limblifter), Lisa Wagner (Cello player for Moist), Gene Hoglan (Strapping Young Lad) and Byron Stroud (Fear Factory). She has played guitar for THOR as well as having Jello Biafra produce and perform back up vocals for her debut album, Evil Needs Candy Too, which was released on Alternative Tentacles in 2005. From 2005 to 2007 she sang in the two lead singer metal/rock band Approach The Throne, with Chris "Val" Valagao (Zimmers Hole) as the other singer. Throughout Kyd's professional career she has sung back up vocals for Paul Hyde, Sandy Scofield, Strapping Young Lad (on the album Alien) and the Devin Townsend Band. She has also been on various compilations including Trooper tribute and a Green Party album featuring Bruce Cockburn and Bill Henderson, Joe Keithley (D.O.A.) and Bif Naked. She was nominated for favourite local female in the Georgia Straight Music Awards 2000. She acted alongside Jello Biafra in the movie The Widower. She has played shows with Our Lady Peace, Bif Naked, Paul Hyde, Strapping Young Lad, DOA, the Melvins and Jello Biafra, and performed approximately 500 live shows from 1986 to 2010 including November 29, 2003 at the Pacific Coliseum Vancouver B.C, with THOR and D.O.A. and on May 1, 2004 at BC Place, Vancouver for (Slam City Jam). Kyd has been a member of over 12 bands from 1986 to 2010. She has done four major Canadian and US tours, including a 40-city tour playing guitar for Thor. 

Ani Kyd was turned into a cartoon character in the Futurama/Simpsons comic - issue #2 of 2, 2002, "Infinitely Secret Crossover Crisis" page 2

Music videos

Discography

Albums 
Evil Needs Candy Too (Alternative Tentacles 2005)

 Rejoyce
 Creepy Feeling
 Taste My Lips
 My 1st Kill
 Fingerpainting
 Six Californian Dollars	
 13
 Left Holding the Bag
 Erase
 Left Right Left
 So Far
 Lost
 Stranger Things
 Silver Cage
 Hardway Home
 The Involuntary Admittance of Jack Ryd. By Michael Kyd

Ani Kyd Blues Experience (Independent 2009)

 2 Guns
 Alone is for me			
 Reckless Soul			
 Run and Hyde	
 Dirty Blues		
 Miss V		
 Simply You
 Waste of Time
 Why do you love me
 One step behind

Compilations 
Grrrls with Guitars Compilation Volume 1 (1999) Grrrls with Guitars Records also featuring Kinnie Starr, Sandy Scofield
 "The Sun In My Eyes"

Shot Spots (2001) on Visionary Records. A Trooper tribute album also featuring DOA, Real McKenzies, SNFU 
 "Boy With A Beat"

The Green Revolution (2004) also featuring Jello Biafra, Randy Bachman, Bruce Cockburn, Bif Naked, and Joe Keithley 
 "Wish You Dead"

Back-up vocals 
Sandy Scofield "Dirty River"(1994) Independent back-up vocals on "Big House"
Paul Hyde "Turtle Island" back-up vocals on "Love Is All", and "Happy Train"
Strapping Young Lad "Alien"  and "Strapping Young Lad"
Jello Biafra And The Guantanamo School Of Medicine "The Audacity Of Hype" back-up vocals on "Pets Eat Their Masters", "Electronic Plantation"

References

Canadian heavy metal guitarists
Living people
1969 births
Alternative Tentacles artists
Musicians from Vancouver
Musicians from Ontario
Place of birth missing (living people)
Life coaches
Women in metal